On 29 September 1934, an Airspeed Courier of London, Scottish & Provincial Airways Ltd crashed just north of Shoreham, Kent. The aircraft was on a scheduled international passenger flight from Heston Aerodrome west of London to Le Bourget Airport, Paris. All four people on board were killed. Two people were injured by flying débris.

Aircraft
The accident aircraft was Airspeed Courier G-ACSY, c/n 16. The aircraft had been registered on 17 May 1934, The aircraft was on loan from Airspeed.

Accident
The aircraft took off from Hounslow Aerodrome at around 17:00 on a scheduled international passenger flight to Le Bourget Airport, Paris France. It flew into an isolated storm over north west Kent. An eyewitness reported seeing the aircraft emerge from the clouds in a vertical dive. The aircraft crashed just north of Shoreham in Timberden Bottom, at the bottom of Cockerhurst Road. An eyewitness stated that he thought the pilot may have stalled trying to avoid high tension power lines.

An inquest into the accident was held at Sevenoaks on 2 October. The victims were identified by documentation and personal belongings as they had received injuries which made visual identification "extremely difficult, if not impossible". The pilot, Ronald Smith (26) from Ealing, was an experienced former Royal Air Force pilot. He had 1,500 hours flying time, of which 150 hours were on the Heston-Paris route.

A memorial cross was installed near the crash site on Cockerhurst Road but after it was vandalised it was removed to Shoreham churchyard, by the north west corner of the tower.

References

Sources

Aviation accidents and incidents in 1934
Aviation accidents and incidents in Kent
1934 in England
1934 disasters in the United Kingdom
September 1934 events